"Stole" is a song by American singer Kelly Rowland. It was written and produced by Dane Deviller, Sean Hosein and Steve Kipner for Rowland's debut solo album Simply Deep (2002). A rock-tinged mid-tempo pop song, "Stole" discusses three different scenarios with teenagers whose lives have been ruined because they have made bad decisions as a result of being misunderstood, involving topics such as gun violence, bullying, suicide, adolescent pregnancy, and depression. Following "Dilemma" (2002), Rowland's worldwide number-one hit with rapper Nelly, "Stole" was released as her official debut single and the album's lead single on September 9, 2002.

The song initially divided critics; some complimented the song's social commentary, Rowland's vocal performance as well as her willingness to break away from the R&B sounds of Destiny's Child, while others criticized the musical direction and considered it an unusual single choice. A commercial success, "Stole" entered the top twenty on the majority of the charts it appeared on, reaching the top five in Australia, Ireland, New Zealand and the United Kingdom, where it remains one of her highest-charting solo singles to date. In the United States, it peaked at number 27 on the Billboard Hot 100.

Inspired by its lyrics, a music video for "Stole" was directed by Sanaa Hamri. In it, Rowland is portrayed as a narrator who comments on the deaths of two male teenagers and their impact on their schoolmates, particularly a female student who discovers that she is pregnant. In further promotion of the song, Rowland performed "Stole" on television shows such as The Tonight Show with Jay Leno, The Late Late Show with Craig Kilborn, CD:UK, and Top of the Pops and the TMF Awards. She also made it part of the setlist of her Simply Deeper Tour (2003) and further concert tours.

Background
During recording their third album, Survivor (2001), Destiny's Child announced that members of the group would disband for a short period to produce solo albums in the coming years, which they hoped would boost interest to Destiny's Child. With different types of music for each member to produce, Rowland and her bandmates Beyoncé Knowles and Michelle Williams were not intended to compete on the charts, and thus, Destiny's Child's management strategically planned to stagger every year each member's album. Whilst Williams was the first to release a debut solo album, Heart to Yours (released in April 2002), the unexpected success of Rowland's collaboration with American rapper Nelly on the song "Dilemma" caused the label to advance the release date of her debut solo album, Simply Deep, to late 2002, replacing it with Knowles' solo debut Dangerously in Love (2003). As a result, Rowland was requested to rush the recording of the album within three weeks to get done, and as no time was left to produce any new material, "Stole"—as with many songs on the album—was selected out of Sony Music's song pool of demo tapes.

Music and lyrics

"Stole", written and produced by Dane Deviller, Sean Hosein and Steve Kipner, is a midtempo pop rock ballad, which incorporates elements of R&B music. It is composed in the key of C major, and is in common time at ninety-six beats per minute. It is written in the common verse-chorus form and features four instruments: electric guitar, drums, guitar, and keyboards. Rowland's vocal range covers close to two octaves; she performs her highest pitch (D5) during the chorus, and her lowest pitch (E3) at the beginning of the verses. "Stole" is thematically a social commentary as well as a lament for unfulfilled potential.

"It tells a story about each of their lives and what they go through and how their lives were taken away from them," Rowland remarked in an interview with CNN's The Music Room, "I loved the song when I heard the lyrics and I hoped it would hopefully touch young people and inspire. I don't mean to sound preachy 'cos it's still got a great melody and a great musical feel behind it but it was just such a great song [...]."

Critical reception
"Stole" received generally mixed reviews from music critics. AllMusic editor Jon O'Brien named the song one of the album's highlights along with "Can't Nobody", "Dilemma" and "Everytime You Walk Out That Door" and called it a "rock-tinged [...] emotive tale of school shootings and suicides." Caroline Sullivan of The Guardian found that the "silky" song emphasized that Rowland's "speciality is the slightly funky party number with a moralising overtone." Chuck Taylor from Billboard found that it was proving "that Rowling is willing to take a risk to prove a point [...] She will likely gain a whole new fan base with her combination of social commentary and impressive vocal talent." British morning newspaper The Independent called "Stole" Simply Deeps "strongest track [...] a lament for unfulfilled potential, especially that of smart kids victimised by dumb thug culture."

Lisa Verrico of The Times noted the song "tells stories of shattered dreams through a series of fictional characters, has a naggingly catchy chorus and [...] shows Rowland as a strong, smooth, versatile singer." BBC Music editor Joy Dunbar found that the "Sade-influenced "Stole" which is about universal life experiences highlights Kelly's soulful, spine tingling singing voice." The Torchs Frank DeBellis remarked that "Stole" is a "single that truly expresses Rowland’s talent and represents the sounds of the entire album." Less impressed, Houston Chronicle journalist Michael D. Clark felt that "with minimalist vibrato, [...] "Stole" tells the tragic stories of characters who never realize their dreams of stardom. The drama unfolds at the pace of Xanax." Vibe journalist Craig Seymour caleld "Stole" a "dreadfully overwrought first single."

Commercial performance
The song was initially released in the United States on September 9, 2002, once the popularity of "Dilemma" began to fade. On September 28, 2002, the song debuted at number seventy-six on the US Billboard Hot 100, with former still remaining on number-one. It took another nine weeks until the single reached its peak position at number twenty-seven on November 30, 2002. It would remain Rowland's highest-charting single as a leading solo artist on the US Hot 100 until the release of her 2011 single "Motivation". More successful on Billboard's component charts, "Stole" reached the top twenty on the Top 40 Tracks and the Mainstream Top 40 charts, while its remixes peaked at number twenty-four on the Hot Dance Music/Club Play chart.

In Norway, it became Rowland's second top ten entry as a solo artist, debuting at number ten and peaking at number six the next week, and staying on the chart for nine weeks. In Switzerland, the single debuted on February 9, 2003, at number twenty-four and jumped to the twelfth position the next week, reaching a peak position of nine for a single week, and remaining on the chart for fifteen weeks. Scoring its highest-peaking position in Ireland and the United Kingdom, where it debuted at number three and two respectively, the song would remain Rowland's biggest-charting solo success Europe-wide until the release of her equally successful 2008 single "Work", excluding "Dilemma" and "When Love Takes Over". The song became Rowland's fifth best selling solo single in the United Kingdom with 210,000 copies being sold as of November 2011.

Music video
 A music video for "Stole" was filmed by Moroccan-American director Sanaa Hamri in Los Angeles, California in mid-2002 and depicts a group of students who have their lives stolen through teenager issues. With the song touching on the topic of school violence, portions of the visuals were shot at the Alexander Hamilton High School in the Castle Heights neighborhood within the Westside of Los Angeles. Production was helmed by Melissa Larsen for Anonymous Content, with Tina Knowles serving as Rowland's stylist. Filming was tracked by BET series Access Granted. Rowland is seen wearing a shirt that has a picture of rapper The Notorious B.I.G. on the left side and another picture of rapper Tupac Shakur on the right side.
 
In the clip, Rowland is seen acting as an unseen character singing to the audience, while explaining what is going on. The first scene is of Jonathan, a young man getting up to go to school, then he goes downstairs to see his sister and distraught mother with a black eye, who had obviously been beaten by his father. Thoroughly depressed, he goes to school, walks into one of the bathroom stalls and shoots himself. Mary, a girl who is an aspiring actress and is alluded to have known Jonathan, walks by and hears the shooting, goes into the bathroom, finds his body and calls the police. Rowland explains that after his death many of his classmates mentioned either never talking to the boy or treating him like an outsider. Another sequence of the video shows Mary going to a doctor's appointment and finding out that she is pregnant. As the song explains, that unexpectedly ends her once promising dream of movie stardom. Next we see a group of young boys on a basketball court, one boy in particular, Greg, who, as Rowland explains, dreamed of becoming a star basketball player. Then the boys glance over at a group of their classmates, obviously not on good terms, then Greg is shot and dies. Mary is later seen with her newborn child, writing "Think before you act" on a class mural dedicated to the two deceased boys.

Track listings

Notes
 denotes additional producer

Credits and personnel
Credits adapted from the liner notes of Simply Deep.

Dane Deviller – writing, production, programming, arrangement, guitar
Sherree Ford – backing vocals, vocal arrangement
Sean Hosein – writing, production, programming, arrangement
Steve Kipner – writing, production, programming, arrangement

Kelly Rowland – lead vocals
Spider – engineering
Dave "Hard Drive" Pensado – mixing
Ethan Willpughby – mixing assistance

Charts

Weekly charts

Year-end charts

Certifications

Release history

References

2002 singles
2003 singles
Kelly Rowland songs
Music videos directed by Sanaa Hamri
Songs about suicide
Songs written by Steve Kipner
Songs written by Dane Deviller
Songs written by Sean Hosein
2002 songs
Columbia Records singles
Songs about bullying
Songs about loneliness
Songs about teenagers
American pop rock songs
Contemporary R&B ballads